Oronsay is an uninhabited island in Loch Sunart, Scotland.

It is low-lying, barren and rocky, deeply indented with sea lochs.

The island encloses Loch Drumbuie, a popular anchorage for yachts and a temporary home to fish farm cages.

References

Uninhabited islands of Highland (council area)